Major General Nicholas Francis Vaux,  is a retired Royal Marines officer who commanded 42 Commando during the Falklands War.

Military career
Vaux joined the Royal Marines in 1954 and completed training in time to take part in the first helicopter-borne amphibious operation as a member of 45 Commando during the Suez Crisis. He was appointed Commanding Officer of 42 Commando in 1981. In 1982, following the Argentine invasion of the Falkland Islands, Vaux deployed to the Islands as part of 3 Commando Brigade, commanding 42 Commando during combat operations and taking part in the Battle of Mount Harriet.

After the Falklands War, Vaux went on to serve as Major General, Commando Forces, and retired from the Royal Marines in 1990.

References

Living people
Royal Navy personnel of the Falklands War
Royal Marines generals
Companions of the Distinguished Service Order
Companions of the Order of the Bath
British military personnel of the Suez Crisis
People educated at St John's School, Leatherhead
1936 births